The 2004 Shanghai International Film Festival (SIFF) was the 7th SIFF to be held and the second festival to be held on an annual basis.

Jury members
 Ding Yinnan (China)
Park Chul-soo (Korea)
David Caesar (Australia)
Kazuo Kuroki  (Japan)
Manfred Wong (HK, China)
Olivier Assayas (France)
Ron Henderson (USA)

Winners
 Best Feature Film: Tradition Of Lover Killing, director Khosro Masumi (Iran)
 Jury Grand Prix: Jasmine Women (China)
 Best Director: Lee Je-yong, Untold Scandal (Korea)
 Best Actress: Gu Meihua, Shanghai Story (China)
 Best Actor: Andreas Wilson, Evil (Sweden)
 Best Screenplay: Esa ILLI, Brother (Finland)
 Best Cinematography: Marita HALLFORS/ Pekka UOTILA, Brothers / Peter MOKROSINSKI, Evil (Sweden) (ex aequo)
 Best Music: Lee Byeong-woo, Untold Scandal (Korea)

External links
2004 Shanghai International Film Festival siff.com website
7th SIFF at the Internet Movie Database

Shanghai
Shanghai
Shang
Shanghai International Film Festival
21st century in Shanghai